The 2005 Guadiana Trophy was a Portuguese football competition that took place between 28–30 July 2005 and featured the clubs Sporting Clube de Portugal, Vitória de Setúbal, Middlesbrough, and Real Betis. Sporting won in the final against Vitória de Setúbal.

Matches

Semi-finals

Third place match

Final

2005
2005–06 in Portuguese football
2005–06 in Spanish football
2005–06 in English football